Sunday is a radio programme currently broadcast on BBC Radio 4 on Sunday mornings between 7.10 and 7.55 am. It features discussions of religious and ethical topics, looking in particular at those currently in the news. Although broadcast on a Sunday, the programme does not restrict itself to exclusively Christian stories and perspectives, but includes guest speakers from a variety of different religions.

Its chief presenters are Edward Stourton and William Crawley. Other presenters since 1970 have included Paul Barnes, Trevor Barnes, Roger Bolton, Andrew Green, Ted Harrison, Alison Hilliard, Clive Jacobs, Jane Little, Chris Morgan, Colin Morris, Gerry Northam, Gerald Priestland, and Libby Purves.

References

External links

BBC Radio 4 programmes
British religious radio programmes